Paul William Friedrich (October 22, 1927 – August 11, 2016) was an American anthropologist, linguist, poet, and Professor of Social Thought at the University of Chicago. He studied at Harvard with Roman Jakobson, and received his Ph.D. from Yale under the supervision of Sidney Mintz. He specialized in Slavic languages and literature, and in the ethnographic and linguistic study of the Purépecha people of Western Mexico, as well as in the role of poetics and aesthetics in creating linguistic and discursive patterns. Among his best known works were  Agrarian Revolt in a Mexican Village (1970; 1977), The Princes of Naranja: An Essay in Anthrohistorical Method (1987), both ethnographic works describing local politics in a small community in the Mexican state of Michoacan. And in linguistics his works The Tarascan Suffixes of Locative Space: Meaning and Morphotactics (1971) and A Phonology of Tarascan (1973) were among the most detailed as well as earliest modern linguistic of the Purépecha language. In 2005, his former students honored him with a festschrift titled Language, Culture and the Individual: A Tribute to Paul Friedrich. In 2007 Yale University awarded Friedrich with the Wilbur Cross Medal. A prolific poet, he also published seven collections of poems, some of them focusing on the haiku form.

Selected publications
Proto-Indo-European Trees (1970)
Agrarian Revolt in a Mexican Village (1977)
The Meaning of Aphrodite (1978)
The Language Parallax. Linguistics, Relativism and Poetic Creativity (1986)
Music in Russian Poetry (1998)

Poetry
From Root to Flower: Selected Poems (2006)
Handholds: Haiku (2009)
a goldfish instant: Concord to India haikus (2010)

References

External links
Paul Friedrich's poetry site
 Guide to the Paul Friedrich Papers 1945-1999  at the University of Chicago Special Collections Research Center 

1927 births
2016 deaths
Harvard University alumni
Linguists from the United States
American anthropologists
Linguists of Mesoamerican languages
American Mesoamericanists
Anthropology educators
Indo-Europeanists
Linguists of Indo-European languages
American semioticians
University of Chicago faculty
Slavists